James A. Rhodes Arena, nicknamed "The JAR," is an arena in Akron, Ohio, United States on the campus of the University of Akron. It was built next to and replaced the University's 3,000-seat Memorial Hall gymnasium. Named for former Ohio governor Jim Rhodes, the arena opened in 1983 and is home to the Akron Zips men's and women's basketball teams and women's volleyball team.

History

The new facility was six years in the making. In 1977, the Ohio General Assembly appropriated $8 million to build a 10,000-seat building over the next two years. But by October 1978, when preliminary plans for the new complex were presented and accepted by the Ohio Board of Regents, the cost of construction had risen to $12.5 million. So the University scrapped the original design in favor of a scaled-down version: a  building, including an  wood floor, designed by architect Thomas T. K. Zung. The University Board of Trustees approved the new version in July 1981, and ground was broken on March 8, 1982.

The building opened on December 3, 1983. The building sits on the eastern edge of campus, on the northeast corner of Union and Carroll streets, on a site that once served Fire Station No. 5 and a parking lot.

The JAR hosted the Ohio Valley Conference men's basketball tournament in 1986. 

In 2002, renovations included a new hardwood floor, four Opto Tech LED displays screen above the game floor, and a $1.1 million sound system. The new system, built under the guidance of the University Athletic audio engineers, replaced a distributed horn-powered PA system with very narrow dispersion angles, coupled with near-proximity coaxial speakers for the upper deck. This setup led to several hot zones and many fans wondering what the announcer said. That changed in 2005 with the installation of a fully zoned system employing EVH-model horn-loaded boxes coupled with six TX Series subwoofers in the South catwalk for the tipoff "Thunderstruck" kick. A separate zone was also included for the floor for the UA Dance Team and Basketball team warmups. Precision series EV combined amplifiers and DSPs tune the system. A Midas Venice series mixing console along with several channels of external dynamic channel processing, as well as better hyperspheric modulation accelerators, handle all audio inputs. The system has reached a 115 dB during games, and is rated up to 130 dB. Over the years, the dedication to auditory excellence of the University's audio engineers has never wavered as they ushered in a new era of high fidelity with several upgrades, bringing the UA fan experience into the digital age. Five hyper-spheric modulation repeaters were added to bridge the gap. UA fans will now enjoy data-optimized audio experiences bringing a personalized, mobile audio experience to every fan. The facility seats 5,500 people on two floors. In addition to the court, the first level features locker rooms, a sports medicine and training facility, a ticket office, a fan team shop and meeting rooms.

During the early 2000s, when LeBron James played on the boys basketball team from nearby St. Vincent - St. Mary High School, some home games were played at the JAR, where they typically outdrew the Zips' men's games.

The decision to name the arena after former governor Rhodes was highly controversial; he ordered the Ohio National Guard to nearby Kent State University before the May 4, 1970 shootings.  Because of anticipated protests, the dedication of the building was not publicly announced in advance.

See also
 List of NCAA Division I basketball arenas

References

External links
James A Rhodes Arena - Akron Zips

College basketball venues in the United States
College volleyball venues in the United States
Akron Zips men's basketball
Akron Zips women's basketball
Basketball venues in Ohio
Sports venues in Akron, Ohio
Tourist attractions in Akron, Ohio
Sports venues completed in 1983
1983 establishments in Ohio